The 2005 Big League World Series took place from July 30-August 6 in Easley, South Carolina, United States. Easley, South Carolina defeated Thousand Oaks,  California in the championship game. It was South Carolina's third straight championship.

Teams

Results

Group A

Group B

Elimination Round

References

Big League World Series
Big League World Series